The 1980 Boston Red Sox season was the 80th season in the franchise's Major League Baseball history. The Red Sox finished fourth in the American League East with a record of 83 wins and 77 losses, 19 games behind the New York Yankees. Manager Don Zimmer was fired with five games left, and Johnny Pesky finished the season as manager.

Offseason 
 November 16, 1979: Tony Pérez was signed as a free agent by the Red Sox.
 March 30, 1980: The Red Sox traded a player to be named later and cash to the Philadelphia Phillies for Dave Rader. The Red Sox completed the deal by sending Stan Papi to the Phillies on May 12.

Regular season 

Fred Lynn had a .301 batting average, with 12 home runs and 61 RBIs. Jim Rice hit .294, with 24 homers and 86 RBIs. On the pitching staff, Mike Torrez was 9–16 and Dennis Eckersley was 12–14. Rick Burleson set an MLB single-season record for double plays turned as a shortstop, 147, which still stands.

Season standings 

Boston's record of 83–77 has a fractionally better winning percentage that Detroit's record of 84–78; .51875 and .51851, respectively.

Record vs. opponents

Notable transactions 
 May 30, 1980: Ted Sizemore was released by the Red Sox.
 June 3, 1980: Oil Can Boyd was drafted by the Red Sox in the 16th round of the 1980 Major League Baseball draft.

Opening Day lineup 
 
Source:

The Milwaukee Brewers defeated the Red Sox on Opening Day, 9–5, via a walk-off grand slam by Sixto Lezcano.

Roster

Statistical leaders 

Source:

Batting 

Source:

Pitching 

Source:

Awards and honors 
 Fred Lynn – Gold Glove Award (OF)
 Chuck Rainey – AL Pitcher of the Month (May)
 Jim Rice – AL Player of the Month (September)
 Bob Stanley – AL Pitcher of the Month (August)

All-Star Game
 Tom Burgmeier, reserve P
 Carlton Fisk, starting C
 Fred Lynn, starting CF
 Jim Rice, reserve OF

Farm system 

Source:

References

External links 
1980 Boston Red Sox team at Baseball-Reference
1980 Boston Red Sox season at baseball-almanac.com

Boston Red Sox seasons
Boston Red Sox
Boston Red Sox
Red Sox